Municipal elections were held in Alberta, Canada on October 18, 2021. Chief elected officials (mayors or reeves) and councillors (or aldermen), are up for election in all cities (except Lloydminster), towns, villages, specialized municipalities, and municipal districts, as are trustees for public and separate school divisions. A provincewide vote on equalization and Daylight Saving Time was also held.

Background 
New spending limits will come into force before the election. New revisions to the Local Authorities Act will now place a $30,000 donation limit on third party advertisers (such as labour unions, and special interest groups). But also exempts them from disclosing their financials until after election day. This is the first time that limits have been placed on third party groups, but critics say the limit is still too high to prevent political influence and that spending is still not capped.

Cities
The following are the municipalities incorporated as cities in Alberta that will vote in the 2021 Alberta Municipal election. All cities in Alberta vote at the same time, except for Lloydminster. Incumbents are marked by an X, and elected candidates are bolded.

Airdrie
Mayor

Council

Top six candidates are elected at large

Beaumont
Mayor

Council

Top six candidates are elected at large

Brooks
Mayor

Council

Top six candidates are elected at large

Calgary

Calgary's incumbent mayor, Naheed Nenshi, has announced he will not seek re-election in 2021.

Camrose
Mayor

Council

Top eight candidates are elected at large

Chestermere
Mayor

Council

Top six candidates are elected at large

Cold Lake
Mayor

Council

Top six candidates are elected at large

Edmonton

Amarjeet Sohi won the Mayoral election, and for the first time in Edmonton's history the majority of City Councilors will be women.

Fort Saskatchewan
Mayor

Council

Top six candidates are elected at large

Grande Prairie
Mayor

Council

Top eight candidates are elected at large

By-election
There was a council by-election held on October 17, 2022 to replace John Lehners who had died.

Results:

Lacombe
Mayor

Council

Top six candidates are elected at large

Leduc
Mayor

Council

Top six candidates are elected at large

Lethbridge

Lethbridge's incumbent mayor, Chris Spearman, has announced he will not seek re-election in 2021.

Plebiscite
Lethbridge's 2021 municipal election will include two plebiscite questions – one on establishing a ward system and one to construct a third river crossing over the Oldman River.

Medicine Hat
Mayor

Council

Top eight candidates are elected at large

Red Deer
Mayor

Council

Top eight candidates are elected at large

Spruce Grove
Mayor

Council

Top six candidates are elected at large

St. Albert
Mayor is elected through First-past-the-post voting.

Councillors are elected through Plurality block voting, with each voter able to cast up to six votes.

Mayor

Council

Top six candidates are elected at large

Wetaskiwin
Mayor

Council

Top six candidates are elected at large

Towns
The following are the municipalities incorporated as towns in Alberta that will vote in the 2021 Alberta Municipal election. Unless otherwise stated, each town elects the top six candidates for council at large. Incumbents are marked by an X.

Athabasca
Mayor

Council

Banff
Mayor

Council

Barrhead
Mayor

Council

Bashaw
Mayor

Council

Top four candidates are elected at large

Bassano
Mayor

Mayor is elected by Council from amongst its members

Council

Top five candidates are elected at large

Beaverlodge
Mayor

Council

Bentley
Mayor

Council

Top four candidates are elected at large

Black Diamond
Mayor

Council

Blackfalds
Mayor

Council

Bon Accord
Mayor

Council

Top four candidates are elected at large

Bonnyville
Mayor

Council

Bow Island
Mayor

Council

Bowden
Mayor

Council

Bruderheim
Mayor

Council

Calmar
Mayor

Council

Top four candidates are elected at large

Canmore
Mayor

Council

Cardston
Mayor

Council

Carstairs
Mayor

Council

Castor
Mayor

Mayor is elected from town council by its members after the election

Council

Top seven candidates are elected at large

Claresholm
Mayor

Council

Coaldale
Mayor

Council

Coalhurst
Mayor

Council

Top four candidates are elected at large

Cochrane
Mayor

Council

Coronation
Mayor

Mayor is elected from town council by its members after the election

Council

Top five candidates are elected at large

Crossfield
Mayor

Council

Daysland
Mayor

Council

Devon
Mayor

Council

Didsbury
Mayor

Council

Drayton Valley
Mayor

Council

Drumheller
Mayor

Council

Eckville
Mayor

Council

Edson
Mayor

Council

Elk Point
Mayor

Council

Fairview
Mayor

Council

Falher
Mayor

Council

Fort Macleod
Mayor

Council

Fox Creek
Mayor

Council

Gibbons
Mayor

Council

Grimshaw
Mayor

Council

Hanna
Mayor

Council

Hardisty
Mayor

Council

High Level
Mayor

Council

High Prairie
Mayor

Council

High River
Mayor

Council

Referendum

Do you support the Town borrowing up to $15,000,000.00 to expand the existing pool facility?

Hinton
Mayor

Council

Innisfail
Mayor

Council

Irricana
Mayor

Council

Killam
Mayor

Council

Lamont
Mayor

Council

Legal
Mayor

Council

Magrath
Mayor

Council

Manning
Mayor

Council

Mayerthorpe
Mayor

Council

McLennan
Mayor

Council

Milk River
Mayor

Council

Millet
Mayor

Council

Morinville
Mayor

Council

Mundare
Mayor

Council

Nanton
Mayor

Council

Nobleford
Mayor

Council

Okotoks
Mayor

Council

Olds
Mayor

Council

Onoway
Mayor

Council

Oyen
Mayor

Council

Peace River
Mayor

Council

Penhold
Mayor

Council

Picture Butte
Mayor

Council

Pincher Creek
Mayor

Council

Ponoka
Mayor

Council

Provost
Mayor

Council

Rainbow Lake
Mayor

Council

Raymond
Mayor

Council

Redcliff
Mayor

Council

Redwater
Mayor

Council

Rimbey
Mayor

Council

Rocky Mountain House
Mayor

Council

Sedgewick
Mayor

Council

Sexsmith
Mayor

Council

Slave Lake
Mayor

Council

Smoky Lake
Mayor

Council

Spirit River
Mayor

Council

St. Paul
Mayor

Council

Stavely
Mayor

Council

Stettler
Mayor

Council

Stony Plain
Mayor

Council

Strathmore
Mayor

Council

Sundre
Mayor

Council

Swan Hills
Mayor

Council

Sylvan Lake
Mayor

Council

Taber
Mayor

Council

Thorsby
Mayor

Council

Three Hills
Mayor

Council

Tofield
Mayor

Council

Trochu
Mayor

Council

Turner Valley
Mayor

Council

Two Hills
Mayor

Council

Valleyview
Mayor

Council

Vauxhall
Mayor

Council

Vegreville
Mayor

Council

Vermilion
Mayor

Council

Viking
Mayor

Council

Vulcan
Mayor

Council

Wainwright
Mayor

Council

Wembley
Mayor

Council

Westlock
Mayor

Council

Whitecourt
Mayor

Council

Specialized municipalities
The following are the municipalities incorporated as specialized municipalities in Alberta that will vote in the 2021 Alberta Municipal election. Incumbents are marked by an X.

Lac La Biche County
Mayor

Council

Mackenzie County
Reeve

Mackenzie County’s reeve is not elected at large; rather the reeve is chosen by its own elected council members.

Council

Municipality of Crowsnest Pass
Mayor

Council

Top six candidates are elected at large

Municipality of Jasper
Mayor

Council

Top six candidates are elected at large

Regional Municipality of Wood Buffalo
Mayor

Council

In multi-member wards, the percentages shown are percentages of votes cast, not percentages of voters who voted.

Strathcona County
Mayor

Council

Municipal districts

Athabasca County
Athabasca County elects its reeve from among its nine council members.

County of Barrhead No. 11
The County of Barrhead No. 11 elects its reeve from among its seven council members.

Beaver County
Beaver County elects its reeve from among its five council members.

Big Lakes County
Big Lakes County elects its reeve from among its nine council members.

Municipal District of Bonnyville No. 87

Brazeau County

Camrose County
Camrose County elects its reeve from among its seven council members.

Clearwater County
Clearwater County elects its reeve from among its seven council members.

Cypress County
Cypress County elects its reeve from among its nine council members.

Foothills County
Foothills County elects its mayor from among its seven council members.

County of Grande Prairie No. 1
The County of Grande Prairie No. 11 elects its mayor from among its nine council members.

Municipal District of Greenview No. 16
The Municipal District of Greenview No. 16 elects its reeve from among its nine council members.

Kneehill County
Kneehill County elects its reeve from among its seven council members.

Lac Ste. Anne County
Lac Ste. Anne County elects its mayor from among its seven council members.

Lacombe County
Lacombe County elects its reeve from among its seven council members.

Leduc County
Leduc County elects its mayor from among its seven council members.

Lethbridge County
Lethbridge County elects its reeve from among its seven council members.

Mountain View County
Mounatain View County elects its reeve from among its seven council members.

County of Newell
The County of Newell elects its reeve from among its ten council members.

Parkland County

Ponoka County
Ponoka County elects its reeve from among its five council members.

Red Deer County

Rocky View County
Council

Rocky View County's council elects the reeve from among the seven of themselves after the election.

County of Stettler No. 6
The County of Stettler No. 6 elects its reeve from among its seven council members.

County of St. Paul No. 19

Sturgeon County

Municipal District of Taber
The Municipal District of Taber elects its reeve from among its seven council members.

County of Vermilion River
The County of Vermilion River elects its reeve from among its seven council members.

Westlock County
Westlock County elects its reeve from among its seven council members.

County of Wetaskiwin No. 10
The County of Wetaskiwin No. 10 elects its reeve from among its seven council members.

Wheatland County
Wheatland County elects its reeve from among its seven council members.

Municipal District of Willow Creek No. 26
The Municipal District of Willow Creek No. 26 elects its reeve from among its seven council members.

Yellowhead County

References 

Elections in Alberta